Topsail High School is a High School located in the unincorporated town of Hampstead, North Carolina. It is part of Pender County Schools. Its current interim principal is Dr. Larry Obeda. Dr. Obeda succeeds the role of Mr. Christopher Madden.

Topsail High School is now a North Carolina School of High Growth. The student population is consistently increasing and currently stands at over 1400.

New building 
A ceremony for the new Topsail High School was held on December 12, 2006 at 2:00 PM and on December 30, 2008 construction was completed on the new school, located within walking distance to the former Topsail High School and Topsail Middle School.  The new school opened for students on January 5, 2009, with a capacity of 1500 students.  The new , two-story high school facility includes two gymnasiums, a theater/auditorium wing, and a separate shop building for wood, metal and automotive classes.  The former Topsail High School building has been renovated and is now occupied by Topsail Middle School starting in August 2009.

Student life 
The school has a population of students consisting of 90% White, 8% African American, 1% Latino, and 1% other .  The school Electric Vehicle Class  has placed first in the Nation in the past eleven years in the EV Challenge competition.  Topsail High School has been used in production for The CW's TV show One Tree Hill. Many students participated as extras in early 2007 when the Topsail High School gymnasium was used for filming basketball scenes for One Tree Hill.

Classes 
Students must pass their English classes each year and meet minimum credit requirements to be promoted to the next grade level.

Students must successfully complete a senior project and score a level 3 or 4 on the following end-of-course exams: Math I, Biology and English II.

Exams count as 20% of the final grade in all classes

A student must have a minimum of 28 credits to graduate, 22 state required classes and 6 local requirements.

Honors & advanced classes
Topsail High School offers many honors and advanced-level classes; students should consider teacher recommendations when registering for classes, and should take the most challenging courses they can.

Grading scale
 A = 100–90
 B = 89–80
 C = 79–70
 D = 69–60
 F = 59 and below

Graduation requirements 
Students graduating from a Pender County high school must successfully complete 28 course units on block scheduling in grades 9 through 12 as described below.
 4 units in English
 4 units in Mathematics 
 4 units in Social Studies 
 3 units in Science
 1 unit in Health/Physical Education
 6 electives, to include a 4-credit concentration
 6 additional courses to meet the locally required 28 courses.

High school courses taken in middle school, and credits earned via Credit by Demonstrated Mastery will be placed on the student's transcript and will count towards credits required for graduation; however, only courses taken in grades 9–12 count toward the student's GPA.

Dual enrollment 

Students may enroll in college courses and gain high school and college credit simultaneously. Tuition fees are waived if courses are taken at Cape Fear Community College. Book costs are not waived and must be paid by the student. Tuition fees are not waived if courses are taken at UNC-Wilmington. Dual enrollment applications with school administrative approval, completion of registration card and placement test scores are required prior to enrolling. Three to five semester hours of
college credit is equal to one unit of high school credit. Students must take at least two courses at Topsail High School and may not register for classes off campus that are offered at the school unless there is a scheduling conflict.

UNC-W requirements
 GPA: 3.5 weighted
 Must be a high school junior or senior.
 Must complete Dual Enrollment Application with school administration approval.
 Must have a PSAT score of 760, SAT score of 1170, and/or ACT score of 24 or higher.

Quality Points and Credit:
 Students will receive one unit of high school credit if the college contact hours are no less than 135.
 Students will receive college credit for courses taken and passed, if the college contact hours are no less than 135.
 Students may only take 2 undergraduate courses per term.

Cape Fear Community College requirements
 Must be a high school junior or senior.
 Must complete the application on CFNC.
 Must meet the required criteria on the Accuplacer Test at Cape Fear Community College and earn proficiency prior to enrollment OR have qualifying ACT or SAT scores.

Quality Points and Credit:
 Students will receive one unit of high school credit for three to five hours of college credit passed, if the contact hours are no less than 135.
 Students will receive college credit for courses taken and passed.
 All students will receive AP credit for each College Transfer course passed.

Class Rank 
Grade Point Average (GPA) will be used to determine rank in class, honor roll and other academic honors. Three levels of courses will be used to determine rank. They provide a fair and equitable method for comparing the academic achievement of students who choose to take Standard, Honors or Advanced Placement courses.

All courses taken in grades 9–12 count for class ranking purposes.

Sports 
Athletic Eligibility

Student athletic eligibility is determined by the successful passing of fifty percent of the classes in the semester prior to the semester of the sport participation. Serving as an on-campus intern, teacher assistant, and media assistant does not count as a class for eligibility. Students must be present in school no less than 85% of the semester in order to be eligible for the next semester's sport season.  Topsail High School currently provides the following sports:

 Cheerleading
 Men's Varsity Soccer
 Men's JV Soccer
 Women's Tennis
 Varsity Volleyball
 J.V. Volleyball
 Women's Golf
 Cross Country
 Varsity Football
 J.V. Football
 Men's Varsity Basketball
 Men's JV Basketball
 Women's Varsity Basketball
 Women's J.V Basketball
 Wrestling
 Varsity Baseball
 J.V. Baseball
 Varsity Softball
 J.V. Softball
 Women's Soccer
 Track
 Men's Golf
 Men's Tennis
 Women's Lacrosse
 Men's Lacrosse
 Swimming

See also 
 Topsail Island
 Topsail Beach, North Carolina
 North Topsail Beach, North Carolina
 Hampstead, North Carolina

References 

Public high schools in North Carolina
Schools in Pender County, North Carolina